More Fun may refer to:

More Fun Comics, one of the earliest American comic-book series
More Fun, a defunct webcomic by Shaenon K. Garrity
More Fun Than an Open Casket Funeral, an album by the band The Accüsed
More Fun in the New World, an album by the band X

It may also refer to:
More Fund Comics, a benefit publication by the Comic Book Legal Defense Fund